Guysborough-Tracadie is a provincial electoral district in  Nova Scotia, Canada, that elects one member of the Nova Scotia House of Assembly.

It was created in 1867 as Guysborough. It included all of Guysborough County and elected two members to the House of Assembly. In 1933, the number of members elected was reduced to one.  In 1993, the name was changed to Guysborough–Port Hawkesbury as the town of Port Hawkesbury was added to the district. In 2003 it was renamed Guysborough–Sheet Harbour as it gained an eastern area from Eastern Shore and lost Port Hawkesbury to Inverness. In 2013, following the recommendations of the 2012 Electoral Boundaries Commission, the district was renamed Guysborough–Eastern Shore–Tracadie and gained the area east of the Tracadie River from Antigonish. Following the 2019 electoral boundary review, it lost territory to Eastern Shore, and was re-named Guysborough-Tracadie.

Geography

Members of the Legislative Assembly
This riding has elected the following Members of the Legislative Assembly:

Election results

1867 general election

1871 general election

1874 general election

1878 general election

1882 general election

1886 general election

1890 general election

1894 general election

1897 general election

1901 general election

1906 general election

1911 general election

1916 general election

1920 general election

1925 general election

1928 general election

1933 general election

1937 general election

1941 general election

1945 general election

1949 general election

1953 general election

1956 general election

1960 general election

1963 general election

1967 general election

1970 general election

1974 general election

1978 general election

1981 general election

1984 general election

1988 general election

1993 general election

1998 general election

1999 general election

2003 general election

2006 general election

2009 general election

2013 general election

|-

|Liberal
|Lloyd Hines
|align="right"|2,876
|align="right"|39.99
|align="right"|+17.77
|-

|New Democratic Party
|Jim Boudreau
|align="right"|2,368
|align="right"|32.93
|align="right"|-18.71
|-

|Progressive Conservative
|Neil Decoff
|align="right"|1,947
|align="right"|27.08
|align="right"|+2.12
|-
|}

2017 general election

2021 general election

References

External links
 2013 riding profile

Nova Scotia provincial electoral districts
Politics of Halifax, Nova Scotia
2012 establishments in Nova Scotia